Leptosphaerulina crassiasca is a fungal plant pathogen.

References

Fungal plant pathogens and diseases
Pleosporaceae
Fungi described in 1968